William Alexander "Sandy" Snow (born November 11, 1946) is a Canadian former professional ice hockey winger. Snow played three games in the National Hockey League with the Detroit Red Wings during the 1968–69 season. The rest of his career, which lasted from 1966 to 1974, was spent in the minor leagues.

Early life
Snow was born in Glace Bay. He started his career playing on five different teams from 1963 to 1969. He began play in the juniors with the Hamilton Red Wings of the OHA Jr. League and the Weyburn Red Wings of the Saskatchewan Junior Hockey League. Snow scored 182 points in his first four years of junior hockey before getting his shot at competing at a higher level.

Career 
Brought up for four games with the Memphis Wings of the CPHL in the 1965–66 season, Snow only recorded one assist, but the coaches saw promise and Snow returned to the lineup the following season as a member of the newly named Fort Worth Wings. He recorded 26 points in the 56 games season and helped Fort Worth in the playoffs by adding another three. The following season Snow improved on those numbers by scoring 34 points in 60 games. He was called up by the Detroit Red Wings to fill in on the fourth line. However, he only played three games, recording two penalty minutes before being traded to the New York Rangers, along with Terry Sawchuk, for Larry Jeffrey on June 17, 1969. The Rangers turned around and traded Snow to the Phoenix Roadrunners of the Western Hockey League along with Don Caley for Peter McDuffe on July 3, 1969.

Snow knocked in 17 goals and 14 assists for Phoenix in 1969–70 and added one goal the following year before being traded to the Kansas City Blues of the Central Hockey League in December 1970. He played in only 12 games before joined the Flint Generals of the International Hockey League to finish out the season. For the next three seasons Snow regained his scoring touch, knocking in 65 goals and 85 assists for the Generals. The 1973–74 season saw Snow join the Brantford Foresters of the OHA Senior A Hockey League and play his last nine games of his career, ending with five points. He retired at the end of the season in 1974.

Career statistics

Regular season and playoffs

External links
 

1946 births
Living people
Canadian expatriate ice hockey players in the United States
Canadian ice hockey right wingers
Detroit Red Wings players
Flint Generals (IHL) players
Fort Worth Wings players
Hamilton Red Wings (OHA) players
Ice hockey people from Nova Scotia
Kansas City Blues players
Memphis Wings players
Ontario Hockey Association Senior A League (1890–1979) players
People from Glace Bay
Phoenix Roadrunners (WHL) players
Sportspeople from the Cape Breton Regional Municipality
Weyburn Red Wings players